John S. Douglas (born 13 March 1961) is an English former footballer who played as a forward for Darlington in the Football League.

Douglas was born in Stockton-on-Tees, County Durham. He played non-league football for Stockton before joining Darlington in January 1986. He made his debut on 31 March 1986, in the starting eleven for the visit to Rotherham United in the Third Division; Darlington won 2–1. He played in three more matches in what remained of the 1985–86 season: two league starts and a substitute appearance in the Associate Members' Cup.

References

1961 births
Living people
Footballers from Stockton-on-Tees
Footballers from County Durham
English footballers
Association football forwards
Stockton F.C. players
Darlington F.C. players
English Football League players